The Muaythai competition at the 2009 Asian Martial Arts Games took place from 2 August to 7 August at the Nimibutr Stadium. There were seven women's events in original program but light welterweight event was cancelled due to lack of entries.

Medalists

Men

Women

Medal table

Results

Men

51 kg

54 kg

57 kg

60 kg

63.5 kg

67 kg

71 kg

75 kg

81 kg

Women

45 kg

48 kg

51 kg

54 kg

57 kg

60 kg

References
 Official website – Muay Thai

2009 Asian Martial Arts Games events
2009
Martial Arts Games
Martial Arts Games